Events from the year 1875 in art.

Events
 Claude Monet finishes painting his Snow at Argenteuil series.
 Foundation of the Art Students League of New York.
 Foundation of the Ruskin Gallery as the Museum of St George in a cottage in Walkley on the outskirts of Sheffield in the north of England by John Ruskin.

Works

 William-Adolphe Bouguereau – Flora and Zephyr
 Gustave Caillebotte
 The Floor-scrapers
 The Gardeners
 The Yerres, effect of rain
 Young Man at his Window (René Caillebotte)
 Julia Margaret Cameron – 'So like a shatter'd column lay the King'; the Passing of Arthur (photograph)
 Paul Cézanne - L'Après-midi à Naples 
 Józef Chełmoński – Indian Summer
 Edgar Degas – Place de la Concorde (Viscount Lepic and his Daughters Crossing the Place de la Concorde)
 Thomas Eakins – The Gross Clinic
 Atkinson Grimshaw – Liverpool from Wapping
 Jean-Paul Laurens – L'Excommunication de Robert le Pieux (The Excommunication of Robert the Pious; Musée d'Orsay, Paris)
 Alexander Litovchenko – Ivan the Terrible shows his treasures to the British ambassador
 Edwin Long – The Babylonian Marriage Market
 Édouard Manet – illustrations for a French translation of Edgar Allan Poe's The Raven, by Stéphane Mallarmé
 Adolph Menzel – The Iron Rolling Mill (Modern Cyclops)
 Claude Monet
 Argenteuil (Musée de l'Orangerie, Paris)
 Camille Monet at her Tapestry
 Train in the Snow
 La Promenade, la femme a l'ombrelle (National Gallery of Art, Washington, D.C.)
 Woman with a Parasol (Camille and Jean Monet)
 William Morris – Acanthus (wallpaper design)
 Erastus Dow Palmer – Robert R. Livingston (bronzes)
Robert Reid – Civil War Memorial (Savannah, Georgia)
 Pierre-Auguste Renoir
 The Lovers
 Lunch at the Restaurant Fournaise (The Rowers' Lunch)
 Nude in the Sun
 Portrait of Claude Monet
 Self-portrait
 Joseph-Noël Sylvestre – The Death of Seneca
 Elizabeth Thompson – The 28th Regiment at Quatre Bras
 James Tissot
 Hush!
 Lilacs
 Hubert von Herkomer – The Last Muster
 James McNeill Whistler
 Nocturne in Black and Gold – The Falling Rocket (approximate date)
 Nocturne: Black and Gold – The Fire Wheel
 Archibald Willard – The Spirit of '76 (Yankee Doodle)
 J. Warrington Wood – Lillian Schnitzer Fountain, Houston, Texas

Births
 March 13 – Lizzy Ansingh, Dutch painter (died 1959)
 March 27 – Albert Marquet, French painter (died 1947)
 July 31 – Jacques Villon, French Cubist painter and printmaker (died 1963)
 October 1 – Frank H. Mason, English marine and poster painter (died 1965)
 November 9 – Sir Hugh Lane, Irish art dealer and gallery founder (died 1915)
 November 13 – Jimmy Swinnerton, American cartoonist and artist (died 1974)
 November 24 – Louis Mathieu Verdilhan, French painter (died 1928)
 December 25 – Manuel Benedito, Spanish painter (died 1963)
 date unknown – Alexandros Christofis, Greek painter (died 1957)

Deaths

 January 18 – O. G. Rejlander, photographer in England (born 1813)
 January 20 – Jean-François Millet, French painter (born 1814)
 February – Auguste-Joseph Carrier, French miniature painter (born 1800)
 February 22 – Jean-Baptiste-Camille Corot, French painter (born 1796)
 February 28 – Sophia Isberg, Swedish woodcarver (born 1819)
 March 20 – January Suchodolski, Polish painter and Army officer (born 1797)
 April 13 – P. C. Skovgaard, Danish romantic nationalist landscape painter (born 1817)
 April 21 – Henry William Pickersgill, English painter specialising in portraits (born 1782)
 April 30 – Jean-Frédéric Waldeck, French artist and explorer (born 1766)
 May 1 – Alfred Stevens, English sculptor (born 1818)
 June 4 – Frederick Walker, English social realist painter (born 1840)
 June 25 – Antoine-Louis Barye, French sculptor (born 1796)
 July 9 – Christian Ruben, German painter (born 1805)
 September 11 – Fyodor Bruni, Russian painter of Italian descent (born 1799)
 September 12 – Paul Fischer, German portrait, miniature and landscape painter (born 1786)
 September 28 – Thomas Ender, Austrian painter (born 1793)
 October 12 – Jean-Baptiste Carpeaux, French painter and sculptor (born 1827)
 November 25 – Mary Harrison, English flower and fruit painter and illustrator (born 1788)
 December 10 – Ōtagaki Rengetsu, Japanese Buddhist nun and poet, potter, painter and calligrapher (born 1791)

References

 
Years of the 19th century in art
1870s in art